Mafia: Chapter 1, known simply as Mafia, is a 2020 Indian Tamil-language action crime film directed and written by Karthick Naren and produced by Allirajah Subaskaran under the banner of Lyca Productions. The film starring Arun Vijay and Priya Bhavani Shankar in leading roles with Prasanna playing the antagonist. The film's music composed by Jakes Bejoy, while cinematography and editing are handled by Gokul Benoy and Sreejith Sarang respectively. Filming was completed on 29 August 2019, and the film was released on 21 February 2020 to mixed reviews from critics.

Plot 
Aryan is a cop from the Narcotics Division in Chennai,  who works alongside his batchmates Sathya and Varun. Aryan lost his twin brother, Dillip, who was addicted to narcotics, due to which he became a cop and his main aim is to eradicate all drug lords, known as Snake's den. Alongside his team are Selvam, his team supervisor and Mugilan, a social activist and also Aryan's neighbour. When Aryan arrives home after catching two culprits, who were into drugs, he receives a news that Selvam has died due to a gunshot. 

Previously, Selvam had concluded the guy behind this, but did not reveal so the culprit wouldn't know about it. Aryan and Sathya investigate around the house, and Aryan concludes that a drug lord was also involved in the murder, and they must find evidence. Mugilan is also targeted by the drug lord and his bodyguard and is killed. Before his death, he provides information about the drug lord in a USB stick, attached to his dog, Pogo's collar and sends Aryan a message. Aryan tracks down Pogo with the tracking chip installed in his collar and checks the information. 

The drug baron is apparently Diwakar Kumaran (D.K), a philanthropic drug trafficker. Mugilan suspects his early source of income was with links of international drug cartels. D.K and his brother/bodyguard Rudra have links with politicians, so that their business cannot be derailed. Knowing this Mugilan and Selvam decides to investigate a place thought to be D.K's secret hideout, but they were both caught. Aryan starts a shootout at the place, and finally concludes D.K's role in drug dealing. D.K, who deduces that Aryan and his team were involved after checking the warehouse cameras, abducts Aryan's family and asks Aryan to meet his doom at a warehouse. 

With a plan, Aryan and his team, tries foiling all of D.K's plan in one night and finally manages to catch D.K, who kills himself to prevent going into custody. In his dying moments, D.K tells Aryan that he is not the main drug lord where it is revealed that Aryan's twin brother Dilip is alive and is actually the main drug lord, who goes by the name Dexter. In a flashback, D.K and Dilip were best friends, who escaped from a police attack  and Dilip had faked his death, when he and D.K found a bounty to start their drug business. After learning Aryan's involvement in destroying his business and on the suicide of his best friend, Dilip/Dexter swears vengeance on Aryan.

Cast 
 Arun Vijay in a dual role as 
Aryan, Narcotics Division officer 
 Dilip aka Dexter, Aryan's twin brother, whist his code name being Cobra.
 Prasanna as Diwakar Kumaran aka DK, Dexter's assistant, whist his codename being Viper.
 Priya Bhavani Shankar as Sathya, Narcotic Control Bureau Officer and Aryan's teammate.
 Thalaivasal Vijay as Mugilan, Aryan's neighbor and social activist
 Bharath Reddy as Inspector Naveen
 Bala Hassan as Varun, Narcotic Control Bureau Officer, and Aryan's teammate
 Aroul D. Shankar as Selvam, Narcotic Control Bureau and head of Aryan's team
 Mathew Varghese as Aryan's father
 Rekha Suresh as Aryan's mother
 Inder Kumar as Rudra, DK's brother
 Dipshi Blessy as Sowmya

Production

Development 
After the success of Dhuruvangal Pathinaaru, Karrthick Naren started work on his second project Naragasooran, which remained unreleased due to financial constraints, despite production completed in 2017. Also Naren's third film Naadaga Medai, starring Kalidas Jayaram, Rahman, Parthiban and Gautham Karthik also put on hold. In June 2018, Naren narrated a script to Silambarasan, for which he agreed to do the film. However, the project was not being confirmed. In March 2019, the production house Lyca Productions signed Naren for his upcoming project, which stars Arun Vijay in the leading role. Prasanna was reported to play the antagonist and Nivetha Pethuraj was signed in for a pivotal role, whom she was replaced by Priya Bhavani Shankar. In May 2019, the makers announced the film's title as Mafia.

Filming 
Principal photography began on 31 May 2019 in Chennai. The shooting of the film's first schedule undergone a brisk pace and was completed on 2 July 2019. The makers started the second schedule of the film on  5 July 2019, soon after the completion of the first schedule. It was touted to be shot in eleven days, thus the film's shoot is scheduled to be completed within 37 days. On 18 August, Priya Bhavani Shankar tweeted that she had completed shooting her portions for the film. Within few days, Arun Vijay and Prasanna headed to Thailand to shoot some crucial action sequences. On 26 August, it was announced that the makers had completed shooting for the film.

Soundtrack 

The film's music is composed by Jakes Bejoy with lyrics written by Vivek and Travis A. King. The soundtrack album featuring three tracks was released on 7 February 2020.

Reception
The Times of India praised the performances and wrote "Mafia would appeal to fans of action movies, especially those which have stylish narcotics backdrop." Behindwoods gave it 2.75 stars out of 5, calling it "an action flick that is majorly uplifted by the stylish treatment and a smart climax for the sequel." Indiaglitz similarly gave it 2.75/5 and praised the lead actors, action sequences and technical aspects while criticizing the predictability of several scenes. Nevertheless, the reviewer felt the film was "an interesting start for an action franchise."Firstpost rated 3 out of 5 stars stating "On the whole Mafia: Chapter I is stylishly cut but has very little substance. But the climax has kindled the expectation meter for Chapter II. In fact, just for the seven minute climax surprise twist we are going with a higher rating than it would have deserved."The Hindu stated "Arun Vijay and Prasanna struggle hard to keep the tension alive in an adequate thriller that abuses its own substance".Deccan Chronicle rated 2.5 out of 5 stars stating "The problem with 'Mafia' is that it makes plenty of noise but has little substance".The Indian Express rated 2 out of 5 stars stating "The biggest problem is that Mafia: Chapter 1 is so randomly written".The News Minute rated 2 out of 5 stars stating "Karthick falls back on voiceovers and an excessive use of English in the dialogues to keep up the sophisticated tone, but the writing falls flat".Hindustan Times stated "Mafia may come across as slightly over stylised for a story set in Chennai and involving officers of the Narcotics Control Bureau, but once you get used to the world, you’re in for a surprise".Sify rated 2.5 out of 5 stars stating "All style and no substance". Baradwaj Rangan of Film Companion South wrote "The single-minded pursuit of surface style kills the movie. The rhythms are flat. The scenes play like summaries that nobody bothered to shape into… a “scene”. There's a lot of dead air."

References

External links 
 

2020s Tamil-language films
Indian action films
Indian gangster films
Films about organised crime in India
Films scored by Jakes Bejoy
Films shot in Chennai
Films shot in Thailand
2020 crime action films
Films about the Narcotics Control Bureau
Films directed by Karthick Naren